Luis Ceferino Hernández Morales (born August 26, 1955) is a retired long-distance runner from Mexico. He claimed the gold medal at the 1975 Pan American Games in the Men's 10,000 metres, and represented his native country the following year at the 1976 Summer Olympics in Montréal, Canada.

References
 

1955 births
Living people
Mexican male long-distance runners
Athletes (track and field) at the 1975 Pan American Games
Athletes (track and field) at the 1976 Summer Olympics
Olympic athletes of Mexico
Sportspeople from Veracruz
People from Xalapa
Pan American Games gold medalists for Mexico
Pan American Games medalists in athletics (track and field)
Medalists at the 1975 Pan American Games
Central American and Caribbean Games medalists in athletics
20th-century Mexican people